Nicaro-Levisa, also Levisa-Nicaro, is a Cuban town and consejo popular ("people's council", i.e. hamlet) of the municipality of Mayarí, in Holguín Province, formed by the settlements of Nicaro and Levisa. With a population of about 20,000, it is the most populated village in the municipality after Mayarí.

History
Nicaro was originally named Lengua de Pajaro, which translated into English means "bird's tongue", due to the shape of its peninsula, as viewed from an air ride.

Geography
The town is composed by the settlements of Nicaro and Levisa. Nicaro lies on a peninsula in the middle of the bay and Levisa more in the inland, very close to the villages of La Italiana and El Purio. The town is surrounded by the Sierra Cristal mountains, part of the Nipe-Sagua-Baracoa range.

Transport

The principal road serving the town is the national road 123 (Carretera de Mayarí) that links Cueto with Baracoa, at the eastern end of the Carretera Central. It counts a railway serving the open mine named "Mina Martí" (for nickel and cobalt exploitation), and the nickel plant "Comandante René Ramos Latour", located near the airport. Nicaro Airport is a minor airfield located in front of Levisa Bay and the Port of Nicaro lies in the northernmost point of the peninsula.

See also
Birán
Guatemala (village)
List of cities in Cuba

References

External links

Mayarí
Populated places in Holguín Province